Monte del Forno is a mountain in the Bregaglia Range (Alps), located on the border between Italy and Switzerland. On its western side it overlooks the Forno Glacier.

References

External links
 Monte del Forno on Hikr

Mountains of the Alps
Alpine three-thousanders
Mountains of Switzerland
Mountains of Lombardy
Italy–Switzerland border
International mountains of Europe
Mountains of Graubünden
Bregaglia